Hossein Rouhani (also Romanized as "Hoseyn Rūhānī"; born August 19, 1983 in Tehran) is an Iranian karateka who competed in the 2006 Asian Games in the 60 kg division and won the gold medal. He is originally from the city of Zanjan.

References

1983 births
Living people
Iranian male karateka
People from Zanjan, Iran
Asian Games gold medalists for Iran
Asian Games silver medalists for Iran
Asian Games medalists in karate
Karateka at the 2002 Asian Games
Karateka at the 2006 Asian Games
Medalists at the 2002 Asian Games
Medalists at the 2006 Asian Games
Islamic Solidarity Games competitors for Iran
21st-century Iranian people